The 2014 Big South women's basketball tournament was the postseason women's basketball tournament for the Big South Conference, taking place March 4–9, 2014, at the HTC Center in Conway, South Carolina. Both semifinal games and the championship were broadcast on ESPN3 with the preliminaries airing online via Big South Network.

Format
All 11 Conference teams were eligible for the tournament. Seeding was determined by their record, with various tiebreakers used to eliminate a tie.

Seeds

Schedule

*Game times in Eastern Time. #Rankings denote tournament seeding.

Bracket

 * Indicates overtime victory
All times listed are Eastern

References

Big South Conference Women's Basketball
Big South Conference Women's Basketball
Big South Conference women's basketball tournament
Big South Conference women's basketball tournament